Suzanne Barber is an American engineer, who is currently the AT&T Foundation Endowed Professor in the Department of Electrical and Computer Engineering at the University of Texas at Austin,

References

Year of birth missing (living people)
Living people
21st-century American engineers
University of Texas at Austin faculty